Khunakorn Sudhisodhi (born on 29 March 1974) is the Thai badminton player. He competed at the 1996 and 2000 Summer Olympics. He won the men's doubles title at the National Championships in 1996, 1998 and 2000; and in the mixed doubles event he clinched six times National title consecutively from 1997-2002. Sudhisodhi was the silver medalists at the 2002 Asian Games and Asian Championships in the mixed doubles event partnered with Saralee Thungthongkam.

Achievements

Asian Games 
Mixed doubles

Asian Championships 
Mixed doubles

Southeast Asian Games 
Men's doubles

Mixed doubles

IBF World Grand Prix
The World Badminton Grand Prix sanctioned by International Badminton Federation (IBF) since 1983.

Men's doubles

Mixed doubles

IBF International
Men's doubles

References

External links
 
 

1974 births
Living people
Khunakorn Sudhisodhi
Badminton players at the 1996 Summer Olympics
Badminton players at the 2000 Summer Olympics
Khunakorn Sudhisodhi
Badminton players at the 1994 Asian Games
Badminton players at the 1998 Asian Games
Badminton players at the 2002 Asian Games
Khunakorn Sudhisodhi
Asian Games medalists in badminton
Medalists at the 2002 Asian Games
Competitors at the 1995 Southeast Asian Games
Competitors at the 1997 Southeast Asian Games
Competitors at the 1999 Southeast Asian Games
Competitors at the 2001 Southeast Asian Games
Khunakorn Sudhisodhi
Southeast Asian Games medalists in badminton